The 2010 Brasil Open was a men's tennis tournament played on outdoor clay courts. It was the 10th edition of the event known as the Brasil Open, and was part of the ATP World Tour 250 series of the 2010 ATP World Tour. It took place in Costa do Sauípe, Brazil, from February 8 through February 14, 2010. First-seeded Juan Carlos Ferrero won the singles title.

ATP entrants

Seeds

1 Rankings as of February 1, 2010.
2 Richard Gasquet was the eighth seed, but had to withdraw due a back injury.

Other entrants
The following players received wildcards into the main draw:
 Ricardo Hocevar
 Ricardo Mello
 Thiago Alves

The following players received entry from the qualifying draw:
 Carlos Berlocq
 Rogério Dutra da Silva
 Rui Machado
 Filippo Volandri

The following player received the lucky loser spot:
 Pablo Andújar

The following player received special exempt into the main draw:
 João Souza

Finals

Singles

 Juan Carlos Ferrero defeated  Łukasz Kubot, 6–1, 6–0
 It was Ferrero's first title of the year and 13th of his career.

Doubles

 Pablo Cuevas /  Marcel Granollers defeated  Łukasz Kubot /  Oliver Marach, 7–5, 6–4

External links
 Official website